Deyhuk District is a district (bakhsh) in Tabas County, South Khorasan Province, Iran. At the 2006 census, its population was 8,200, in 2,303 families.  The District has one city: Deyhuk.  The District has two rural districts (dehestan): Deyhuk Rural District and Kavir Rural District.

References 

Districts of South Khorasan Province
Tabas County